Idris Ackamoor (born Bruce Baker, January 9, 1951) is an American multi-instrumentalist, composer, actor, tap dancer, producer, administrator, and director. He is also artistic director of the jazz ensemble The Pyramids.

The Pyramids
He founded the band The Pyramids in the early 1970s at Antioch College in Ohio as part of Cecil Taylor's Black Music Ensemble. The band toured Africa in the 1970s, adding musicians and new instruments, before settling in San Francisco in the US. Exploratory self-releases Lalibela (1973), King Of Kings (1974), and Birth / Speed / Merging (1976) had very limited runs, being sold only at concerts out of the trunks of their cars.

The band split up in 1977, but Ackamoor has reformed the Pyramids several times. Strut Records released new studio albums by the band in the 2010s: We Be All Africans and An Angel Fell.

Discography
 Portrait (1998)
 Centurian (2000)
 Homage to Cuba (2004)
 An Angel Fell (2018)
 Shaman! (2020)

With Earl Cross, Rashied Al Akbar, and Muhammad Ali
Ascent of the Nether Creatures (NoBusiness, 2014) recorded in 1980

References

External links
Cultural Odyssey 

American jazz saxophonists
American male saxophonists
Antioch College alumni
1951 births
Living people
African-American saxophonists
Musicians from Chicago
21st-century American saxophonists
Jazz musicians from Illinois
21st-century American male musicians
American male jazz musicians
21st-century African-American musicians
20th-century African-American people
NoBusiness Records artists